Salirophilia is a sexual fetish or paraphilia that involves deriving erotic pleasure from soiling or disheveling the object of one's desire, usually an attractive person. It may involve tearing or damaging their clothing, covering them in mud or filth, or messing their hair or makeup. The fetish does not involve harming or injuring the subject, only their appearance.

It is related to wet and messy fetishism, bukkake (ejaculating semen on someone), cum shot, gokkun (drinking semen of someone), facial, omorashi (preventing urination), mysophilia (ex. fetishism of used underwear), urolagnia (urinating on someone), and coprophilia, etc. Salirophilia also extends to other areas such as forcing the partner to wear torn or poorly fitting clothing and other actions which would render them normally unattractive.

The fetish sometimes manifests itself in the defacing of statues or pictures of attractive people, especially celebrities or fictional characters. It is common to refer to the practice involving ejaculating on a photo as "facepainting". This may be done with a physical photograph or the screen of a phone, tablet, or computer. The fetishist finds this sexually exciting, rather than mere vandalism and they sometimes form collections of defaced art, either created by themselves or in collaboration with others, for future enjoyment. A video of the fetishist ejaculating on a picture of someone or a photo depicting the result is known colloquially as a "tribute".

The term comes from the French for soiling, salir. In cases where the fetish is obsessive it is called saliromania.  It is frequently confused with salophilia, an attraction to salt or salty things (especially body sweat) that derives from the Latin for salt, sal.

Mysophilia
Mysophilia relates to soiled or dirty material or people. Mysophiliacs may find dirt, soiled underwear, feces, or vomit to be sexually arousing.

It is possible for people with mysophilia to be aroused by unclean locales, such as an alleyway, or a dirty room/bathroom; wearing the same clothing for many days at a time; or not bathing, from mere days to several weeks. Helen Memel, the teen-aged protagonist in Charlotte Roche's novel Wetlands and David Wnendt's film based on the book, would be considered a mysophiliac, insofar as she sought out the dirtiest of public toilets and rubbed her vulva around the rim of the toilet. She also went for long periods of time without washing her vulva, deriving pleasure from its scents and secretions.

See also
BDSM
Edgeplay
Erotic humiliation

References

Paraphilias